Harfleur is a suburban railway station in Harfleur near Le Havre, France. It is situated on the Paris–Le Havre railway. Services are provided by SNCF branded TER Normandie regional rail network:

References

Railway stations in Seine-Maritime